A Flintstones Christmas Carol (also known as The Flintstones: A Christmas Carol, or The Flintstones: in Charles Dickens' A Christmas Carol) is a 1994 American animated made-for-television film featuring characters from The Flintstones franchise, and based on the 1843 novella A Christmas Carol by Charles Dickens. Produced by Hanna-Barbera, it features the voices of Henry Corden, Jean Vander Pyl and Frank Welker. It first aired November 21, 1994 in syndication

The special followed numerous Christmas-themed The Flintstones productions. It has been released on DVD.

Plot
The Bedrock Community Players is mounting A Christmas Carol, and all of the town's citizens are either planning to attend or be involved in the production: Barney Rubble is playing Bob Cragit, with Betty as Mrs. Cragit and his son Bamm-Bamm as Tiny Tim; Mr. Slate is Jacob Marbley; Wilma Flintstone is serving as the stage manager, while her daughter Pebbles plays Martha Cragit; even Dino has a role, playing the Cragit's family pet. It is Fred, though, who has landed the leading role of Ebonezer Scrooge. Unfortunately, he has let his role go to his head, thinking himself a star and spending all of his time rehearsing his lines rather than focusing on his job or family. On Christmas Eve, in his rush to get to work and complete his Christmas Shopping, Fred forgets that he must take Pebbles to "cave care", and later to pick her up from cave care. When Fred arrives at the theater, he discovers a furious Wilma, who breaks down in tears as she tells Fred about his mistake.

The play finally begins with narrator Charles Brickens reading the opening lines, and after a momentary bout of stage fright, Fred enters. The play proceeds as normal. As the second act opens, Wilma and Betty discover that Garnet, the woman playing the Ghost of Christmas Past, has contracted the "Bedrock Bug," a flu-like illness. As stage manager, Wilma is left to play the part herself. During the next scene, at Fezziwig's Christmas party, Betty informs Wilma that Maggie has come down with the Bedrock Bug as well; Wilma dons her costume and plays Belle. Fred realizes he forgot the presents and runs to the store, he is approached by the hooded figure of the Ghost of Christmas Yet to Come, revealing to be the actor Philo Quartz, he drives him back to the theater. The second act takes place. The third act begins with the Ghost of Christmas Yet to Come appearing before Scrooge; he shows the elderly man an abandoned gravestone marked with the words "EBONEZER SCROOGE." The scene shifts to Scrooge's bedchamber—he is alive, and he discovers that it is Christmas morning. He recruits a passing boy (played by the same child who Fred entrusted with his presents) to purchase a prize "Turkeysaurus" and have it sent to the Cragits for a feast. Scrooge prepares to go out and explore the city on Christmas morning; along the way, he meets Wilma, who has taken on the role of one of the members of the Piltdown Charitable Foundation, as the original actor has caught the Bedrock Bug. Fred acts as if the woman is Belle (much to narrator Brickens's frustration, as the ad-libbing is not in his script), and begs for both her and Wilma's forgiveness, admitting his recent selfishness and promising that he has changed his attitudes. Wilma reluctantly plays along.

The play ends with the narrator informing the audience of the permanent change in the elderly man. Bamm-Bamm forgets his line "God bless us, everyone!," leaving Pebbles to make the declaration herself. When the curtain falls, the company drops Fred and scolds him "for being such a Scrooge." Fred apologizes, informing Wilma that he has finally realized that his friends and family, rather than his role in the production, are what matter most. As the company begins to depart, the Ghost of Christmas Yet to Come takes off his hood, revealing himself as Dino, who took the part after Philo came down with the Bedrock Bug.

A changed Fred says that when the Flintstones get home, he's going to make dinner and invite Wilma's mother. Unfortunately, after he says this, he comes down with the flu, and Wilma decides to make dinner with her mother's help, since the Bedrock Bug "lasts for a day".

Voice cast

Production
The special came after three Christmas-themed episodes and specials in The Flintstones franchise, namely "Christmas Flintstone" (1964), A Flintstone Christmas (1977) and A Flintstone Family Christmas (1993). It was produced by Hanna-Barbera in Los Angeles, California and directed by Joanna Romersa.

The teleplay was written by Glenn Leopold, based on A Christmas Carol by Charles Dickens. The music was composed by Steve Bernstein. Jean Vander Pyl returned as the voice of Wilma Flintstone, a role she performed since first chosen by Bill Hanna and Joe Barbera to voice the character in 1960. The special was animated by Fil-Cartoons in Manila, Philippines

Broadcast and release
The special premiered on the American Broadcasting Company on November 21, 1994. It has been rebroadcast in later years, by Boomerang and Canada's YTV.

On September 26, 1995, Turner Home Entertainment initially released A Flintstones Christmas Carol on VHS in their Turner Family Showcase collection, debuting 24th among children's video rentals in the United States in October of the same year. Warner Home Video released it on DVD in Region 1 on October 2, 2007. An included bonus was "Christmas Flintstone", an episode from Season 5 of The Flintstones.

Reception
The special received a Film Advisory Board award. TV Guide gave it two stars, saying the story within a story is challenged by "the continual cutting away to backstage incidents that turn the careful momentum of Dickens' narrative into jagged stops and starts," adding "how can these prehistoric folk be celebrating the birth of a messiah not due for several millenia?"

See also
 Adaptations of A Christmas Carol
 List of Christmas films

References

Bibliography

External links

 
 
 
 

1994 television films
1994 films
1990s American animated films
1990s Christmas films
American Broadcasting Company television specials
American Christmas comedy films
American television films
American animated comedy films
Animated Christmas films
Animated Christmas television specials
Animated films based on animated series
Animated films based on novels
1990s Christmas comedy films
Christmas television films
Films based on A Christmas Carol
Television shows based on A Christmas Carol
Films based on television series
The Flintstones films
Hanna-Barbera animated films
Television films based on television series
American Christmas television specials